Payne is a 1999 American sitcom adapted from the 1970s British television comedy Fawlty Towers. This adaptation, which was a mid-season replacement on CBS, originally aired from March 15 to April 28, 1999. It costars John Larroquette, who was also an executive producer for the series, and JoBeth Williams. Featured too as regular supporting characters are Julie Benz and Rick Batalla. Despite receiving the blessing of John Cleese, who reportedly agreed to be an "irregular cast member" and perform in a recurring role as a rival hotelier if Payne were renewed, the series was cancelled following the broadcast of its eighth episode. A total of nine episodes were filmed, but one was not aired as part of the series' original presentation on CBS.

Payne is the third unsuccessful attempt by American television producers to adapt and transplant a version of Fawlty Towers to the United States. The first one, developed in 1978, is a 30-minute sitcom costarring Harvey Korman and Betty White. Titled Snavely and directed by Hal Cooper, that production never progressed beyond the completion of a pilot. The second series, Amanda's starring Bea Arthur, was broadcast in 1983 on ABC and lasted 10 episodes before it was cancelled.

Basic description
Payne was a remake of Fawlty Towers, though set in this version at an ambiguous location on the coast of California, as opposed to Torquay, England, in Fawlty Towers. The action takes place at the Whispering Pines Inn, owned and operated by Royal Payne and his wife, Constance. Royal was always trying to improve the quality of his hotel and eventually franchise the place, in search of immortal legendary status as a hotelier, like Hilton or Waldorf.

The pilot episode, "Pacific Ocean Duck" (which actually aired fifth in sequence), merged the plots of the Fawlty Towers episodes "Gourmet Night" and "The Hotel Inspectors".

Mirroring the opening sequence of Fawlty Towers, each episode begins with a closeup of the "Whispering Pines" sign, which either falls over or a letter or some other piece of it falls off as the scene progresses. In the episode "I Never Forget a Facelift", involving how the hotel deals with a hurricane, the sign is shown lying in pieces, shattered by the storm's heavy winds.

Characters

 Royal Payne (John Larroquette) Inspired by Basil Fawlty, Royal had an overpowering obsession (not unlike Basil's generally obsessive behavior) with keeping up with a rival hotel called the Sand Dune, located just a short distance up the road. His schemes to do so cheaply or over-simply were the source of many of his problems. The viewer was given the impression that the only reason Whispering Pines ever had any guests at all was that it was in a popular resort area and the far superior Sand Dune was nearly always full. Payne like Basil is guilty of false economy, rudeness, and two-faced phonyness.
 Constance (Connie) Payne (JoBeth Williams) The antagonistic dynamic between Connie and Royal was also nearly identical to that between Sybil and Basil with one distinct exception: their sex life was apparently extremely vibrant and healthy, whereas Basil and Sybil's was blatantly non-existent. Connie's gossip sessions on the telephone with her friends (a Sybil Fawlty characteristic) invariably had her bragging about how fantastic Royal was in bed, implying that this was why she continued to tolerate him. Since Royal had a Basil-like sense of embarrassment, this caused him enormous consternation. Connie is also the first name of Connie Booth, who played the maid, Polly, in Fawlty Towers and who co-wrote the show with her then-husband, Cleese.
 Breeze O’Rourke (Julie Benz) A waitress/chambermaid, based on Polly in Fawlty Towers. One difference between Breeze and Polly was that Breeze was staunchly proud that she was a virgin, "saving herself for marriage". Otherwise, Breeze was, like Polly, intelligent, efficient, and repeatedly saving Royal from his own incompetence.
 Mo (Rick Batalla) A bellhop from India, Mo is essentially modeled on the Manuel character in Fawlty Towers.

Reception
During its eight-week run in 1999, Payne received widespread negative reviews in the American and Canadian media. Caryn James, of The New York Times, disliked the series from its outset. In her review dated March 15, she wrote: 'It's enough to say, that this remake of John Cleese's hilarious, farcical Fawlty Towers has been given a hackneyed Hollywood treatment', adding that the comedic talents of Larroquette had been 'reduced to delivering hideous lines' from a patently weak script. Tom Shales, television critic for The Washington Post, was also critical of the sitcom in his review published on the same date, especially about Larroquette's casting as a much less likeable Basil Fawlty. Shales stated: 'Larroquette is all too believable as an obnoxious boor.' After cautioning every potential viewer of the new series to "Spare Yourself Payne", Shales recognized the production as 'barely' an improvement over the 1983 sitcom Amanda's, a previous failed attempt to adapt Fawlty Towers to American television. On Rotten Tomatoes, Payne has an aggregate score of 22% based on 2 positive and 7 negative critic reviews.

Tom Jicha, television/radio reporter for the Sun-Sentinel, suggests in his review that the comedy should be renamed 'Payne-ful', adding: 'Let's be clear about this; Payne is not a bad show because it doesn't stand up to Fawlty Towers. It is a bad show, period.' Entertainment critic Kinney Littlefield provided an equally blunt appraisal on behalf of the Orange County Register: 'The original Fawlty Towers (1975/79) was wicked fun. Payne is just plain dumb. It is written for morons.' Other national and regional newspapers also issued disparaging reviews, a few being in USA Today, The Atlanta Constitution, The Sun, The Boston Globe, Cincinnati Enquirer, the Chicago Tribune, and the New York Post, which featured a bold heading for a review by Michele Greppi, proclaiming 'Original Fawlty Still Towers Over This Clumsy Knock-Off'.

John Allemang, the television critic for The Globe and Mail, summed up his opinion of Payne in the title of his review dated March 17: 'TV comedy inflicts Payne and suffering.' "Fawlty Towers it's not", he asserted, explaining that '"Payne"'s basic structure and its less 'dangerous' comedic tone belie any serious comparison of the American series to its British predecessor:

Payne did have some supporters in the media. In his assessment in Variety, syndicated entertainment critic Ray Richmond described it as an 'agreeably over-the-top farce' with performances that make it 'more than just another Brit-inspired rip-off'. He also referred to Larroquette as 'one of TV's comedy treasures' and noted that he and JoBeth Williams displayed 'a surprisingly tasty chemistry' as wise-cracking spouses. After watching a preview of the series on March 11, Richmond observes: 'Subsequent episodes, screened from a review tape, slide somewhat in quality and level of laughs, but not enough to dampen the enthusiasm for a sitcom that so enthusiastically embraces its own sense of stupidity and refuses to let go., Manuel Mendoza, of the Dallas Morning News, was also a fan of Payne, at least of Larroquette's performance after seeing the series' initial broadcast: 'John Larroquette strikes just the right balance between Mr. Cleese's unreconstructed near-sociopath and the typical American-sitcom bad boy.' Additional positive comments about the show could be found in the Detroit Free Press, the New York Daily News, the St. Louis Post-Dispatch, The Tampa Tribune, and Pittsburgh Post-Gazette. Still, most of those supportive comments registered as mild compliments, not avid endorsements. For example, the Detroit Free Press reported on March 15 that 'in moments...Payne can be lightly enjoyable'; while Walt Belcher, of The Tampa Tribune, admitted in his review that the series was "not as hilarious as Fawlty Towers" but 'it shows potential'.

Episodes
Episodes aired in the UK on the ITV network soon after the series run. Episode 9 was also broadcast in the UK, unlike on CBS.

References and notes

External links
Episode guide 
Publicity photos 
 

1999 American television series debuts
1999 American television series endings
1990s American sitcoms
CBS original programming
Television series by Universal Television
Payne
Fawlty Towers
Television shows set in California